The Lord Will Make a Way is the 14th studio album by Al Green and his first gospel album, released in 1980.

Critical reception

The album won a Grammy in the category of Best Soul Gospel Performance, Traditional. The title track was also Grammy nominated in the category of Best Soul Gospel Performance, Contemporary.

Track listing
 "The Lord Will Make A Way" - 3:39
 "Pass Me Not" - 3:10
 "Too Close" (Alex Bradford) - 3:49
 "Highway to Heaven" - 2:56
 "Saved" (Aaron Purdie) - 3:47
 "None But the Righteous" - 3:24
 "In The Holy Name Of Jesus" (Aaron Purdie) - 3:24
 "I Have a Friend Above All Others" - 3:02
 "Highway to Heaven (Reprise)" - 1:32

Personnel 
 Al Green – vocals, lead guitars, arrangements (1, 2, 4, 6, 8, 9)
 Jesse Butler – acoustic piano 
 Johnny Brown – organ
 Reuben Fairfax Jr. – bass
 John Toney – drums 
 Andrew Love – saxophones 
 Jack Hale – trombone 
 Ben Cauley – trumpet 
 Edgar Matthews – trumpet
 Fred Jordan – string arrangements

Production 
 Al Green – producer 
 Stroud – photography 
 Dennis Hill – cover design

References

Al Green albums
1980 albums
Gospel albums by American artists